Chronic Illness is a quarterly peer-reviewed medical journal that covers research in the field of chronic illnesses. Its editor-in-chief is Christopher Dowrick (University of Liverpool). It was established in 2005 and is currently published by SAGE Publications.

Abstracting and indexing 
Chronic Illness is abstracted and indexed in:
 British Nursing Index
 EMBASE/Excerpta Medica
 EmCare
 SciVal
 Scopus

External links 
 

SAGE Publishing academic journals
English-language journals
General medical journals
Quarterly journals
Publications established in 2005